Rajan Sankaranarayanan is an Indian biologist and Chief Scientist at the Centre for Cellular and Molecular Biology (CCMB) in Hyderabad. He was born in Madras. He pursued his Master's degree in Madura College of Madurai Kamaraj University (MKU) followed by his Ph.D. in Indian Institute of Science (IISc).

In 2011, Sankaranarayanan was awarded the Shanti Swarup Bhatnagar Prize for Science and Technology, the highest science award in India, in the biological sciences category.
He is also the recipient of the National Bioscience Award for Career Development. In 2020, Sankaranarayanan was awarded the Infosys Prize in life sciences, the most prestigious award that recognizes achievements in science and research, in India.

Awards and recognition 
Sankaranarayanan was awarded the Bhatnagar Prize awarded in 2011, the G.N. Ramachandran Gold Medal in 2015, and the G.D. Birla award in 2018. He has been elected to all three national academies of science in India.

In December 2020, Sankaranarayanan received the Infosys Prize for Life Sciences – for his fundamental contributions towards understanding one of the most basic mechanisms in biology.

References

Year of birth missing (living people)
Living people
20th-century Indian biologists
Recipients of the Shanti Swarup Bhatnagar Award in Biological Science
N-BIOS Prize recipients